Networking is the sharing of information or services between people, businesses, or groups. It is also a way for individuals to grow their relationships for their job or business. As a result, connections or a network can be built and useful for individuals in their professional or personal lives. Networking helps build meaningful relationships that are beneficial to all involved parties to exchange information and services. Gaining new significant business acquaintances can be obtained by networking meetings, social media, personal networking, and business networking.

In the second half of the twentieth century, networking was promoted to help business people to build their social capital. In the US, workplace equity advocates encouraged business networking by members of marginalized groups (e.g., women, African-Americans, etc.) to identify and address the challenges barring them from professional success. Mainstream business literature subsequently adopted the terms and concepts, promoted them as pathways to success for all career climbers.

Overview 
There are many ways to network, whether the traditional way of making connections through a group or club or non-traditional through hobbies or unrelated events. They all serve the same purpose of making close and valuable connections that allow for an equal exchange of knowledge or advice. Business networks are types of social networks which are developed to help executives connect with other managers and entrepreneurs to further each other's interests  by forming mutually beneficial business relationships. By doing so, they can both each other's business interests by forming mutually beneficial business relationships. Business networking is a way of leveraging your business and personal connections to help you bring in new customers, vendors or to get great advice for running your business. There are several prominent business networking organizations that create models of networking events. When followed, the models allow the business person to build new business relationships and generate business opportunities simultaneously. A professional network service is an implementation of information technology in support of business networking. Chambers of Commerce and other business-oriented groups may also organize networking activities. However, there are multiple networking groups, and there is no one-size-fits-all for every person or company. The models will vary based on their field of business and what they want their outcomes/goals to be.

It is important to note; networking works mainly in favor of small businesses. The owners have to dabble with a variety of job functions in a small set-up. When they meet up with like-minded people, they learn from their experiences and guidance on essential. They can even find partners and angel investors through a networking group of experienced business owners. A plethora of networking events takes place in every country where entrepreneurs can meet, expand their affiliations, educate themselves and feel empowered. Adopting smart tactics can go a long way in securing partnerships, friendships and acquaintances. Collaboration is also a huge part of networking. According to Sorenson, Ritch L., et al. it can create stronger relationships, better conflict management and build better connections. Networking works best when supported by good conflict resolution and collaboration when trying to solve a problem.

History 
Before online business networking, face-to-face networking was the only option for business people. This was achieved through a number of techniques such as trade show marketing and loyalty programs. Though these techniques have been proven to still be an effective source of making connections and growing a business, many companies now focus more on online marketing due to the ability to track every detail of a campaign and justify the expenditure involved in setting up one of these campaigns.

Ethics  
Networking can be an effective way for job-seekers to gain a competitive edge over others in the job-market. The skilled networker cultivates personal relationships with prospective employers and selection panelists, in the hope that these personal affections will influence future hiring decisions. This form of networking has raised ethical concerns. The objection is that it constitutes an attempt to corrupt formal selection processes. The networker is accused of seeking non-meritocratic advantage over other candidates; advantage that is based on personal fondness rather than on any objective appraisal of which candidate is most qualified for the position.

There are some risks that must be considered when using and publishing on social media, because companies can be held liable for the content posted by their employees on blogs or social networks. According to Olswang it is necessary to prepare a clear privacy policy while also remaining compliant to protecting company data and adhering to the social media platform's privacy policy. This ensures the networker can still build their connections and not risk damaging the relationships they've built.

Networked business 
Many businesses utilize networking as a key element in their marketing plan. It helps to develop a strong feeling of trust between those involved and plays a big part in raising the profile of a company. Suppliers and businesses can be seen as networked businesses, and will tend to source the business and their suppliers through their existing relationships. As well as with the companies they work closely with. Networked businesses tend to be open, random, and supportive, whereas those relying on hierarchical, traditional managed approaches are closed, selective, and controlling. These phrases were first used by Thomas Power, businessman and chairman of Ecademy, an online business network, in 2009.

Additionally, social media has made a positive impact on networking as it also has allowed for more openness and inclusivity. To be successful with social media, it is vital to consider and plan an approach that can be maintainable and reliable. The best method is to put time aside weekly and make a plan for a few days a week and block off time to improve a social media approach.

See also 
 Professional network service
 Personal network
 Guanxi
"7 Tips for Networking."

References
Entrepreneur Media, Inc. "The Right Way to Network on Social Media." Entrepreneur. Entrepreneur, 19 February 2015. Web. 9 May 2018.
Misner, Ivan. "What Is Business Networking, Anyway?" Entrepreneur. Entrepreneur, 29 August 2008. Web. 9 May 2018.
Misner, Ivan. "The 5 Types of Business Networking Organizations." Entrepreneur. Entrepreneur, 1 November 2017. Web. 9 May 2018.
Schweitzer, Sharon. "The Importance and Value of Business Networking." The Huffington Post. TheHuffingtonPost.com, 3 August 2017. Web. 9 May 2018.
Rizk, Elias. "How to improve your sales performance at networking events? " ebCard, 12 November 2019 

Business models
Business terms